The Himachal Pradesh Legislative Assembly election, 2017 was held on 9 November 2017 to elect all 68 members of the Himachal Pradesh Legislative Assembly.
 
The term of the previous Legislative Assembly ended on 7 January 2017. Since 2012, the Indian National Congress Party was in power in the outgoing assembly with 36 seats. The lone opposition party was Bharatiya Janata Party.

The Constitution of India states that the term of Legislative Assemblies is five years, at maximum. The term of current Legislative Assembly ends on 7 January 2018. The previous election, held in 2012 resulted in Congress gaining majority of seats and Virbhadra Singh becoming Chief Minister.

Himachal Pradesh, as a state of India follows Parliamentary system of government similar to other states. The Government is responsible to the Assembly and stays in power only if it has the support of majority members. Elections take place on a first past the post basis, the candidate with the most votes wins the seat regardless of an absolute majority. Every citizen of the state, who is 18 and above is eligible to vote. The Governor then invites the leader of the largest party or coalition to form the government. As is common in most other first past the post electoral systems, the state's politics are dominated by two parties – the Indian National Congress and Bharatiya Janata Party.

State elections in India are often fought on central issues, and the results are regarded as a referendum on the central government's policies. This is especially true in the case of states where the two national parties – Congress and BJP are in direct contest with each other. The state units of the parties are not completely independent and the central authority of the parties has a considerable influence over candidate selection and campaigning. However, state issues do tend to dominate the discourse. The Congress party has projected its current Chief Minister Virbhadra Singh as its Chief Ministerial candidate for the elections. BJP announced Prem Kumar Dhumal as their Chief Ministerial candidate. Dhumal lost his seat from the Sujanpur constituency. Eventually, the BJP made Jai Ram Thakur the Chief Minister who won from the Seraj constituency. In the 17th Assembly segment, Tashigang village becomes the highest polling station at an altitude of 15256 feet. The polling station falls in Buddhist-dominated Lahul-Spiti that form the Mandi Lok Sabha seat, the second-largest constituency in India. Situated at about 29 Kilometres from the India-China border, the polling station covers two villages - Tashigang and Gets. As per the revised electoral roll, the two villages have 48 Voters of which 30 are men and 18 women.

Preparations for elections

VVPAT-fitted electronic voting machines were used in all of the 7,521 polling stations, the first time that the entire state will see the implementation of VVPAT to ensure greater transparency to the voter. Over 5 million voters are registered in the state. VVPAT slips were counted in 2 polling stations each across all 68 Himachal Pradesh constituencies.

India's first voter, Shyam Saran Negi, voted for the 29th time at Kalpa polling station in Kinnaur.

Tibetan voters

Indian electoral rules allow any citizen of India above 18 years of age to vote in any states and union territories of India, provided he/she is a resident of that state. India has a large Tibetan diaspora that fled from Tibet along with the Dalai Lama. Dharamshala, a city in Himachal Pradesh, is the capital of the Central Tibetan Administration. The Government has allowed Tibetans born in India between 1950 and 1987 to vote in the elections. This however, does not affect their relationship with the CTA.

Candidate list 
BJP declared list of 68 candidates on 18 October 2017 which includes 14 first timers with 21 new faces.

Schedule

Opinion polls

Results 
The results were declared on 18 December 2017.

Results by District

Results by Constituency

References

2017
2017
2017 State Assembly elections in India
November 2017 events in India